In response to the finish in 1981, for the 1982 Tour de France, French minister of sports Edwige Avice objected to the amount of advertising in the race, and suggested the Tour to return to the national team format. The Tour organisation needed the money brought in by the sponsors, and no changes were made to the team structure.

The Tour organisation decided to start with 17 teams, each with 10 cyclists, for a total of 170, a new record. Tour director Félix Lévitan suggested to reduce the number of cyclists by starting with teams of 9 cyclists, but this was rejected.
Teams could submit a request to join until 15 May 1982. To promote cycling in the United States of America, the American national cycling team would automatically be accepted, but the American team made no request.

The following 17 teams each sent 10 cyclists, for a total of 170:

Hinault, who had won the Tour in 1978, 1979 and 1981, and left the 1980 Tour in leading position, was the clear favourite for the victory. In those other years, Hinault had won several races before the Tour, but in 1982 he had only won one major race, the 1982 Giro d'Italia. Hinault tried to be the fourth cyclist, after Fausto Coppi, Jacques Anquetil and Eddy Merckx, to win the Giro-Tour double.

Notable absent was Lucien Van Impe, who was second in the 1981 Tour de France, winning the mountains classification. Since the 1969 Tour de France, Van Impe had started each edition, winning the general classification in the 1976 Tour and the mountains classification five times. Van Impe wanted to join, but his team Metauro was not invited, as the organisation considered it not strong enough to ride both the Giro and the Tour. Van Impe tried to find a team to hire him only for the 1982 Tour, but was not successful.

Start list

By team

By rider

By nationality

References

1982 Tour de France
1982